Rabe is a crater on the planet Mars, located in the Noachis quadrangle at 43.9° south latitude 34.9° east longitude. It measures approximately 108 kilometers in diameter. Its name was approved in 1973, and refers to Wilhelm F. Rabe, a German astronomer (1893–1958).

There is a huge field of dunes in the center of Rabe.

Gallery

See also 
 List of craters on Mars: O-Z

References 

Impact craters on Mars
Noachis quadrangle
Noachis Terra